Translation is the conversion of text from one language to another.

Science 
 Translation studies, the systematic study of the theory, description and application of translation, interpreting, and localization
 Translation (biology), part of the biological process of protein biosynthesis from messenger RNA
 Frequency translation, converting a radio signal from one frequency to another by mixing the input signal with a second signal 
 Broadcast translator, rebroadcasting a radio signal at a different frequency
 Translation (physics), movement that changes the position of an object, moving every point the same distance in the same direction, without rotation, reflection or change in size
 Translation operator is an alternative name for the displacement operator in quantum optics

 Translational research
 Translation (sociology)

Mathematics 
 Translation (geometry), moving points the same distance in the same direction
Shift operator, a translation within the real line
 Translation (group theory), the operation of multiplying by a group element

Computing 
 Address translation
 Port address translation, allows a single public IP address to be used by many hosts on a private network
 Network address translation, transceiving network traffic through a router by re-writing the source and/or destination IP addresses 
 Virtual-to-physical address translation
 Program transformation
 The translation phase of a compiler (or, by extension, the entire process of compilation)
 Translate Toolkit, freeware localization toolkit 
 Translator (computing), multiple meanings
 Bing Translator, online machine translation service in Bing.com
 Google Translate, online machine translation service in Google

Literature and entertainment 
 Translation (rhetoric device) a form of parody, where a sarcastic paraphrase of a source quotation is given to mock its author
Translations (play), 1980 play by Brian Friel
The Translator, 1999 novel by Leila Aboulela
Universal translator, science fiction device which translates between any languages
"...In Translation", seventeenth episode of the first season of Lost 
"Translators", a poem by Patti Smith from her 1973 book Witt
 Translate (Sexy Sadie album), 2006 album by Sexy Sadie
Translator (band), a San Francisco new wave band
 Translator (album), their third album
 Translation (album), 2020 album by Black Eyed Peas
 Translate (Luke Abbott album), 2020 album by Luke Abbott

Religion 
 Translation (relic), the removal of holy objects from one locality to another 
 Translation (Mormonism), in the Church of Jesus Christ of Latter-day Saints, the change of a person from mortality to immortality without death
 Translation (ecclesiastical), the transfer of a bishop from one diocese or episcopal see to another

See also
 Conversion (disambiguation)
 Interpretation (disambiguation)
 Transformation (disambiguation)